Mission Temple Fireworks Stand is the fifteenth studio album by the American country music band Sawyer Brown. Their first studio album since Can You Hear Me Now three years previous, it produced three singles. The first of these, which was the title track, was a collaboration with Robert Randolph. Following it was "They Don't Understand", which in late 2005 became the band's first Top 40 country hit since "800 Pound Jesus" in 2000. "They Don't Understand" was also a Top 15 on the Hot Christian Songs charts. A cover of The Georgia Satellites' "Keep Your Hands to Yourself", the third single from this album, failed to chart.

Track listing

Personnel 

Sawyer Brown
 Mark Miller – lead vocals 
 Joe Erkman – rhythm guitars
 Shayne Hill – lead guitars, backing vocals
 Hobie Hubbard – keyboards, backing vocals
 Jim Scholten – bass 
 Joe Smyth – drums

Youth choir on "One Little Heartbeat at a Time"
 Caleb Chapman
 Will Franklin Chapman
 Gunnar Miller
 Hunter Miller
 Madison Miller
 Logan Miller

Additional musicians
 Tim Akers – keyboards
 Bernie Herms – keyboards
 Blair Masters – keyboards
 Duncan Cameron – additional lead guitars
 John Deadrick – acoustic guitars
 Michael Hodge – guitars
 Mac McAnally – acoustic guitars
 Jerry McPherson – guitars
 Dale Oliver – guitars
 Robert Randolph – pedal steel guitar (1)
 Richard "Buck" Reed – steel guitar
 Jonathan Yudkin – mandolin
 Robert Graves – bass
 Eddie Bayers – drums, percussion
 Bobby Huff – drums, percussion
 Paul Leim – drums, percussion
 Chris McHugh – drums, percussion

Production 
 Mark A. Miller – producer 
 Sam Hewitt – engineer 
 John Lewis – engineer 
 Dale Oliver – additional engineer 
 J.C. Monterrosa – assistant engineer
 Jeff Balding – mixing 
 David Bryant – mix assistant 
 Richard Dodd – mastering 
 Glenn Sweitzer – art direction, design 
 Marina Chavez – photography 
 Amanda Friedland – wardrobe

Chart performance

2002 albums
Curb Records albums
Sawyer Brown albums